Mir Dad Shah, also spelled Mir Daad Shah, was an Iranian Baloch farmer who lived in a village called Nillag within Iranian Balochistan. With the goal of securing an independent Balochistan and largely discontent with Iranian rule, Shah participated in a rebellion and armed insurgency against the Shah of Iran, Mohammad Reza Pahlavi, in the 1950s.

See also
 Iran–Iraq War
Insurgency in Balochistan
Insurgency in Sistan and Baluchestan (Iran)
Iran–Pakistan relations
 Dadshah – a movie based on the farmer and rebel's life

References

Further reading
 Mordechai Nisan, Minorities in the Middle East: A History of Struggle and Self-Expression, 

Baloch politicians
1958 deaths
Rebellions in Iran